Tushar Kanti Bhattacharya is an Indian politician. He was elected to the West Bengal Legislative Assembly from Bishnupur (Bankura) in the 2016 West Bengal Legislative Assembly election as a member of the Indian National Congress. Later he joined his old party All India Trinamool Congress.

References

Living people
Bharatiya Janata Party politicians from West Bengal
Trinamool Congress politicians from West Bengal
Indian National Congress politicians from West Bengal
People from Bankura district
Year of birth missing (living people)
West Bengal MLAs 2016–2021